Recife may refer to:

 Recife, a city located in Pernambuco state, Brazil
 Sport Club do Recife, a Brazilian football (soccer) club
 Arena Recife-Olinda, a sports stadium
 Augusto Recife, a Brazilian football (soccer) player
 Eduardo Recife, a Brazilian artist
 Recife Cinema Festival, a Brazilian  film festival
 Recife Broad-nosed Bat, a species of bat